Valerie Sweeting (born July 9, 1987 in Redvers, Saskatchewan) is a Canadian curler from Lottie Lake, Alberta She currently plays third for Team Kerri Einarson.

Career
Sweeting grew up in Maryfield, Saskatchewan. In 2007, Sweeting played third for Hailey Surik's junior rink out of Saskatoon, Saskatchewan. The team represented Saskatchewan at the 2007 Canadian Junior Curling Championships. After posting an 8–4 record, they lost to Manitoba in a tiebreaker match.

After juniors, Sweeting moved to Alberta where she formed her own team with Megan Anderson at third, Carly Quigley at second and Whitney Eckstrand at lead. In 2010, in her very first provincial championship, Sweeting surprised many by defeating former World championship bronze medalist Cathy King and Olympic bronze medalist Shannon Kleibrink to capture the provincial crown. She would be the youngest skip ever to represent Alberta at the national Scotties Tournament of Hearts. At the 2010 Scotties Tournament of Hearts, she skipped her province to a 4–7 record.

Sweeting played in her first Grand Slam event later in the season. Ranked 44th going into the 2010 Players' Championship, she won three straight games after losing to Kleibrink, qualifying her for the playoffs. She then lost in the quarterfinal to Stefanie Lawton.

After the 2009–10 season, Sweeting re-jigged her team's lineup, adding Leslie Rogers at third, replacing Quigley. The team had a less eventful season in 2010–11, including winning just one game at the 2011 Alberta Scotties Tournament of Hearts. After the season, Sweeting brought in a new front-end of Joanne Courtney and Rachelle Pidherny. The team improved on the year before, and finished in fourth place at the 2012 Alberta Scotties Tournament of Hearts. Following the season, Sweeting added Dana Ferguson at third position, replacing Rogers.

In the 2012–13 season, Sweeting's rink narrowly missed the playoffs at the 2013 Alberta Scotties Tournament of Hearts, but the team was able to gain enough CTRS points to qualify for the 2013 Canadian Olympic Pre-Trials. The team was one of the qualifiers in the event, giving them the right to play in the 2013 Canadian Olympic Curling Trials. At the trials, Sweeting led her rink to a 3–4 record, failing to qualify for the playoffs. Also in the 2013–14 season, the rink had two quarterfinal appearances at Grand Slams, at the 2013 Curlers Corner Autumn Gold Curling Classic and the 2013 Colonial Square Ladies Classic. Sweeting continued her success that season by going undefeated at the 2014 Alberta Scotties Tournament of Hearts, where her team beat Cheryl Bernard in the final. Sweeting then represented Alberta once again at the national championships, the 2014 Scotties Tournament of Hearts. At the Hearts, Sweeting led Alberta to an 8–3 finish following the round robin. This put her into the playoffs, where she beat Saskatchewan's Stefanie Lawton and Manitoba's Chelsea Carey to advance to the final. There, she lost to Ontario's Rachel Homan 8–6 to win the silver medal.

After the 2013–14 season, Sweeting's third Joanne Courtney left the team to play for the Homan rink, whom they had lost to in the 2014 Scotties final. She would be replaced by Andrea Crawford, who left the team early in the season when things weren't working out. With Cathy Overton-Clapham playing third as their spare, they won their first slam at the 2014 Masters of Curling. With Lori Olson-Johns as their new full-time third, they also made it to the semifinals at two slams and the quarterfinals at one other. They also won the 2014 Canada Cup of Curling, defeating Homan in the final. The team would win the 2015 Alberta Scotties Tournament of Hearts, earning the team a berth at the 2015 Scotties Tournament of Hearts. There, Sweeting led her rink to a 9–2 round robin record, good enough for second place, behind Team Manitoba, skipped by Jennifer Jones. They would go on to lose to Manitoba in the 1 vs. 2 game, but rebounded in the semifinal, beating Saskatchewan (skipped by Stefanie Lawton), before losing to Jones again in the final.

The team found less success in their next season. They won just one tour event (the 2015 HDF Insurance Shoot-Out), though they still made the playoffs in five of the six slams of the season, including making it to the finals of the 2015 Masters, where they lost to Homan. The team would not represent Alberta at the Scotties, as they lost in the finals of the 2016 Alberta Scotties Tournament of Hearts to the Chelsea Carey rink, who would end up winning the national title.

In the 2016–17 season, the Sweeting rink made the playoffs in five of the six slams, including winning the 2016 GSOC Tour Challenge and losing in the final of the 2017 Players' Championship. The team again lost in the finals of the 2017 Alberta Scotties Tournament of Hearts, this time losing to Shannon Kleibrink. The next season, Sweeting defended her title by winning the 2017 GSOC Tour Challenge. Sweeting played in the 2017 Canadian Olympic Curling Trials, going 4–4, just missing the playoffs. Her dreams of making the Olympics would not be over though, as she teamed up with Brad Gushue to play in the 2018 Canadian Mixed Doubles Curling Olympic Trials. The pair went 5–3 in the round robin, but rallied off three straight victories in the playoffs to make it to the finals. There, they lost to John Morris and Kaitlyn Lawes. Sweeting then turned her attention to the 2018 Alberta Scotties Tournament of Hearts, where she lost in the 3 vs. 4 game. In addition to winning the Tour Challenge, the Sweeting team made the playoffs in one more slam that season, the 2017 Boost National.

In February 2018, it was announced that the Sweeting team would be breaking up with Sweeting joining the all-skip squad of Kerri Einarson, Shannon Birchard and Briane Meilleur for the 2018–19 season. Sweeting would play third on the team. They began the season by winning three straight World Curling Tour events in three weeks: the 2018 Stu Sells Oakville Tankard, the inaugural Morris SunSpiel and then the Mother Club Fall Curling Classic with a fourth win at the Curlers Corner Autumn Gold Classic in October. In December, the team lost in the finals of the 2018 Canada Cup and 2018 National. Their strong play during the early part of the season earned them enough points to put team Einarson in the Wild Card game at the 2019 Scotties Tournament of Hearts. However, the team lost to the lower-ranked Casey Scheidegger rink. The team would rebound to have a strong finish at the end of the season, winning the 2019 Players' Championship and losing in the final of the 2019 Champions Cup.

Team Einarson had two playoff finishes at the first two Slams of the 2019–20 season, losing to Anna Hasselborg in the quarterfinal of the Masters and once again to Hasselborg in the final of the Tour Challenge. The team did not have the same success at the Canada Cup as they did in 2018, finishing with a 2–4 record. However, at the 2020 Manitoba Scotties Tournament of Hearts, her team succeeded. They finished the round robin and championship round with a 7–1 record, which qualified them for the final. There, they defeated Jennifer Jones. It was Sweeting's first Manitoba Scotties Tournament of Hearts provincial title. Team Einarson represented Manitoba at the 2020 Scotties Tournament of Hearts, where they continued their success. They finished first in the round robin with a 9–2 record and then won the 1 vs. 2 page playoff game, qualifying them for the final. Sweeting won her first Canadian Championship when they defeated Rachel Homan 8–7 in and extra end. Sweeting was named the All-Star Third for the tournament. The team was set to represent Canada at the 2020 World Women's Curling Championship before the event was cancelled due to the COVID-19 pandemic. The Scotties would be their last event of the season as both the Players' Championship and the Champions Cup Grand Slam events were also cancelled due to the pandemic.

Team Einarson returned to the Scotties Tournament of Hearts in 2021 as Team Canada. They went 7–1 in the round robin, with their only loss coming against Ontario's Rachel Homan. This qualified them for the championship round. There, they won three games and lost one to Manitoba's Jennifer Jones. They advanced to the playoffs as the second seed, defeating Alberta's Laura Walker 9–3 in the semifinal. In the final, they defeated Homan to win their second consecutive Scotties gold. Sweeting was named the First Team All-Star third for the second year in a row. A month later, Sweeting was back in the Calgary bubble to compete with Marc Kennedy at the 2021 Canadian Mixed Doubles Curling Championship. The pair qualified for the playoffs with a 5–1 record before losing to Lisa Weagle and John Epping in the round of 12, eliminating them from contention. Sweeting returned to the bubble for a third time in April 2021, along with her women's team to play in the two only Grand Slam events of the abbreviated season. The team made it to the semifinals of the 2021 Champions Cup where they lost to Team Homan, but got their revenge at the 2021 Players' Championship a week later, where they beat Homan in the final. The following week, Team Einarson represented Canada at the 2021 World Women's Curling Championship. The team had a slow start to the event, falling to 1–5 after their first six games. They turned things around, however, winning six of their seven remaining round robin games to qualifying for the playoffs. They then faced Sweden's Anna Hasselborg in the qualification game, which they lost 8–3.

The Einarson rink had a slow start to the 2021–22 season, failing to win any of their first five tour events. Their best finish came at the 2021 Sherwood Park Women's Curling Classic where they lost in the final to Tracy Fleury. The team reached the quarterfinals of the 2021 Masters, however, then missed the playoffs at the 2021 National. At the 2021 Canadian Olympic Curling Trials, the team went through the round robin with a 4–4 record. This earned them a spot in the first tiebreaker, where they defeated Casey Scheidegger 8–6. They then faced Krista McCarville in the second tiebreaker, where they lost 4–3 and were eliminated. The team's next event was the 2022 Scotties Tournament of Hearts in Thunder Bay, Ontario. Through the round robin, the defending Scotties champions posted a perfect 8–0 record, earning a spot in the playoffs. They then lost in the seeding round to New Brunswick's Andrea Crawford, meaning they would have to win three straight games to defend their championship title. In the playoffs, the team won the 3 vs. 4 page playoff against Team Fleury and then defeated New Brunswick's Crawford in the semifinal to reach the Scotties final where they would face Northern Ontario's McCarville rink. After controlling the entire game, Team Einarson sealed the victory with a steal of one in the tenth end. With the win, they became just the fourth team to win three consecutive Scotties titles. They then went on to represent Canada at the 2022 World Women's Curling Championship, where they fared much better than in 2021. The team finished the round robin tied for second place with a 9–3 record, however, due to their draw shot challenge, finished third overall. This placed them in the qualification game where they defeated Denmark's Madeleine Dupont to advance to the semifinal. There, they took on South Korea's Kim Eun-jung. After taking control in the seventh end, South Korea stole the ninth and tenth ends to hand the Canadian team a 9–6 loss. They were able to rebound in the bronze medal game with an 8–7 victory over Sweden's Anna Hasselborg. Team Einarson wrapped up their season at the final two Slams of the season. At the 2022 Players' Championship, they made it all the way to the final where they were defeated by the Hasselborg rink. At the 2022 Champions Cup, the team secured their fourth Grand Slam title as a foursome with a 10–6 victory over Gim Eun-ji.

Personal life
Sweeting is a graduate of the University of Saskatchewan. She is currently a case processing agent at Immigration, Refugees and Citizenship Canada Case Processing Centre Edmonton. She has one son.

Grand Slam record

Former events

Teams

References

External links

Curlers from Saskatchewan
1987 births
Living people
Canadian women curlers
People from Vegreville
Curlers from Edmonton
Canada Cup (curling) participants
Canadian women's curling champions
People from the County of St. Paul No. 19